Ratan Chandra Kar is an Indian health official from Andaman and Nicobar. He is known for helping the Jarawa tribe from disease outbreaks, such as measles in 1998.

In 2023, he was awarded fourth highest civilian Award in India, the Padma Shri.  Locally, he known as Jarawa Doctor.

Life and Career 

Dr. Ratan Chandra Kar was born in 24 Paraganas North. He is a general physician and is the author of the book The Jarawas of the Andamans.

References 

Year of birth missing (living people)
Living people